Joseph Campbell (1904–1987) was an American mythologist.

Joseph or Joe Campbell may also refer to:
 Joseph Campbell (poet) (1879–1944), Irish lyricist
 Joseph Campbell (accountant) (1900–1984), American comptroller general
 Joseph Campbell (judge) (born 1949), Australian judge
 Joe Campbell (footballer, born 1894), English footballer, played for Heywood Utd, Oldham Athletic, Wigan Borough, Blackburn Rovers, Rochdale, Stalybridge Celtic, Morecambe and Great Harwood
 Joseph Campbell (footballer) (1903–?), English footballer
 Joe Campbell (footballer, born 1925) (1925–1980), Scottish footballer
 Joe Campbell (Australian footballer) (1893–1982), Australian rules footballer
 Joe Campbell (golfer) (born 1935), American golfer
 Joe Campbell (baseball) (born 1944), American professional baseball player
 Joe Campbell (American football, born 1955), American football player
 Joe Campbell (American football, born 1966), American football player
 Joe Campbell (actor) (died 2005), American actor
 Joseph A. Campbell (1817–1900), founder of the Campbell Soup Company
 Joseph B. Campbell (1833 or 1836–1891), American politician from Alaska in the 1870s
 Joseph L. Campbell (1942–2011), roadie for The Allman Brothers Band
 J. W. R. Campbell (Joseph William Robert Campbell, 1853–1935), Irish Methodist minister and educator
 Joseph Campbell (archdeacon) (1856–1933), Anglican priest and mineralogist in Australia
 Joseph Campbell (politician), American politician from Maine
 Joe Campbell (Georgia politician), American politician from Georgia

See also
 Joseph Campbell Butler, musician
 Campbell (surname)